Nienke Kingma (born 12 February 1982 in Driebergen) is a rower from the Netherlands.

Kingma took part in the World Championships of 2006 in the fours finishing fifth in Eton. A year later at the World Championships in Munich she was part of the double sculls and became 9th.

She qualified for the 2008 Summer Olympics in Beijing with the Dutch eights forming a team with Femke Dekker, Annemiek de Haan, Roline Repelaer van Driel, Annemarieke van Rumpt, Sarah Siegelaar, Marlies Smulders, Helen Tanger and cox Ester Workel.  This team went on to win the silver medal at the 2008 Summer Olympics, finishing just under two seconds behind the winning US team.

At the 2012 Summer Olympics she competed for the Dutch team with Chantal Achterberg, Sytske de Groot, Roline Repelaer van Driel, Claudia Belderbos, Carline Bouw, Jacobine Veenhoven and cox Anne Schellekens.  The team won the bronze medal.

References

1982 births
Living people
Dutch female rowers
Olympic medalists in rowing
Olympic rowers of the Netherlands
Olympic silver medalists for the Netherlands
People from Driebergen-Rijsenburg
Rowers at the 2008 Summer Olympics
Rowers at the 2012 Summer Olympics
Olympic bronze medalists for the Netherlands
Medalists at the 2012 Summer Olympics
Medalists at the 2008 Summer Olympics
World Rowing Championships medalists for the Netherlands
21st-century Dutch women
Sportspeople from Utrecht (province)